The 2015 NCAA Division I Field Hockey Championship was the 35th women's collegiate field hockey tournament organized by the NCAA, to determine the top Division I college field hockey team in the United States. The semifinals and championship match were played at the Phyllis Ocker Field in Ann Arbor, Michigan from November 20 to 22, 2015. This was the first time Michigan hosted the tournament finals.

Syracuse defeated North Carolina, 4–2, to win their first national title.

Qualified teams

 A total of 18 teams qualified for the 2015 tournament, a decrease of one team from 2014. 10 teams received automatic bids by winning their conference tournaments and an additional 8 teams earned at-large bids based on their regular season records.

Automatic qualifiers

At-large qualifiers

Bracket

All-tournament team 
Jess Jecko, Syracuse
Alyssa Manley, Syracuse
Alma Fenne, Syracuse
Zoe Wilson, Syracuse
Nina Notman, North Carolina
Malin Evert, North Carolina
Julia Young, North Carolina
Roisin Upton, Connecticut
Karlie Heistand, Connecticut
Amanda Kim, Duke
Hannah Barreca, Duke

See also 
NCAA Division II Field Hockey Championship
NCAA Division III Field Hockey Championship

References 

2015
Field Hockey
2015 in women's field hockey
2015 in sports in Michigan